Brutal Verschimmelt (BV, literally "brutally moldy") was a German punk band from Kempten (Allgäu). In 1983 they released an album by Rock-O-Rama.

In 1980 Carlo Kallen, with some high school friends, founded his first band Adolf Streit & die NS-Verbrecher, which then became Psychorotz and then Brutal Verschimmelt.
First concerts happened in Allgäu in the vicinity of the band B.Trug which, being the older punks, pulled the younger ones with them.
B.Trug had at that time a record contract with the punk label Rock-O-Rama from Brühl and referred also Brutal Verschimmelt to that label.
A demo recording was sent to Herbert Egoldt who gave the band a contract.
Egoldt invited the band in May 1983 to Köln where they recorded their debut album in 16 hours.

Egoldt himself produced the vinyl record.
A cover draft showing an anti-war collage was rejected by Egoldt and substituted with a skeleton warrior with a mohawk fighting some kind of monster.
The politically left lyrics of the band were not printed on the supplemental sheet, presumably because at that time Egoldt already fancied with the Rock Against Communism market.
The band learned about this first after having received their 100 free records.
Hereupon they spray-painted these record covers and added a supplemental sheet on which they explained the issue with the record cover.

Shortly after release of the debut album the band split, after drummer Franz quit and the band didn't find a substitute.
 Carlo Kallen played later with the Ewings, Chili Confetti and Die Üblichen.

Over the years the record became a sought-after rarity.
The album was released for a second time 1990 without telling the band.

In January 2013 a new release was published as a double record under the title Und die Zukunft ist doch rot at Höhnie Records.
Besides the original album the record contains also the demo tape as well as the a live recording from 25. February 1982.

On the occasion of this re-release three of the original members decided to go on a Germany tour as Brutal Verschimmelt with nine concerts in June 2013.

References 

German punk rock groups